Michael Harrington Matthews (26 April 1914 – 29 May 1940) was an English first-class cricketer and naval officer who died in action in World War II.

The son of Walter Matthews, who was Dean of St. Paul's Cathedral from 1934 to 1967, Michael Matthews went to Westminster School, where he played cricket for the first XI from 1930 to 1933. In his last two years at school he was selected to keep wicket for The Rest in the annual schools match at Lord's against Lord's Schools. In the 1932 match he made four stumpings and a catch when John Cameron took all 10 Lord's Schools wickets with his leg-spin.

He went up to Christ Church, Oxford, in 1933, and played a sprinkling of matches for the university team in 1934 and 1935 before establishing himself as the principal wicket-keeper in 1936 and 1937, and playing in the annual match against Cambridge University. In his last match he took six catches to help Oxford to victory over Cambridge for the first time in five years. His highest score was 68 when he top-scored in the first innings against Minor Counties in 1936.

He was awarded a first in Greats, and read for the Bar at Gray's Inn. He married Loveday Abbott shortly after the outbreak of World War II. He was serving in the Royal Naval Volunteer Reserve as a Sub-lieutenant on HMS Greyhound, the destroyer which was the first to reach Dunkirk, when he was killed in a bombing raid.

References

External links
 
 Michael Matthews at CricketArchive
 Commonwealth War Graves Commission: Matthews, Michael Harrington

1914 births
1940 deaths
English cricketers
Oxford University cricketers
People educated at Westminster School, London
Alumni of Christ Church, Oxford
Royal Naval Volunteer Reserve personnel of World War II
Royal Navy personnel killed in World War II
Royal Navy officers of World War II
Deaths by airstrike during World War II
Military personnel from Surrey
Royal Navy officers